The name Katrina has been used for three tropical cyclones in the Atlantic Ocean, three tropical cyclones in the Eastern Pacific Ocean and one tropical cyclone in the South Pacific. It was used in the Pacific on the old four-year lists. The name was retired in the North Atlantic after 2005, and was replaced by Katia for the 2011 season.

Atlantic
Hurricane Katrina (1981) – late-season Category 1 hurricane that impacted portions of the Greater Antilles and Bahamas
Tropical Storm Katrina (1999) – Disorganized and weak tropical storm that caused minor damage in Central America and Mexico
Hurricane Katrina (2005) – A powerful Category 5 major hurricane that devastated the U.S. Gulf Coast, making landfall first near Miami, Florida, as a Category 1 hurricane, near Buras, Louisiana and Long Beach, Mississippi, at Category 3 intensity, causing over US$125 billion in damage and over 1,800 deaths.

Eastern Pacific
Hurricane Katrina (1967) – struck Baja California and caused flooding in the southwest U.S. as a tropical storm.
Tropical Storm Katrina (1971) – affected Baja California and hit Mexico as a tropical storm.
Hurricane Katrina (1975) – did not affect land.

Australian region
Cyclone Katrina (1998) – severe and erratic tropical cyclone that affected the Solomon Islands, Vanuatu, and Northern Australia. Its remnants eventually regenerated into Cyclone Victor–Cindy.

Atlantic hurricane set index articles
Pacific hurricane set index articles
Australian region cyclone set index articles